Tamara Huselnykova is a Ukrainian architect-restorer born in Borzya.

Life and career 
In 1969, she graduated from the Kyiv National University of Construction and Architecture.

From 1965 to 1994, she worked in the Ukrainian Specialized Scientific and Restoration Production Department ("Ukrproektrestavratsiya").

The laureate of the Shevchenko Prize in 1981 — together with Shorin, Ozerny, Semernyov, Steshin, Ivanov, Khlopynska, Cherednychenko, Keranchuk — for the creation of the Museum of Shipbuilding and the Fleet.

References 

1940 births
Living people
Ukrainian women architects
People from Borzinsky District